Pen Tranch is a large village and a community in Torfaen, South East Wales.

It lies to the west of Pontypool in the valley leading west to Crumlin. It lies in the historic county of Monmouthshire and the preserved county of Gwent.

The area includes the electoral wards of Pontnewynydd, Snatchwood, and Wainfelin for Torfaen County Borough Council.

References

Villages in Torfaen
Communities in Torfaen